Hickcox is a surname. Notable people with the surname include:

Charlie Hickcox (1947–2010), American swimmer
John Howard Hickcox Sr. (1832–1897), American librarian, bookseller, and numismatist

See also
Hickox (disambiguation)